Guanine nucleotide exchange factor MSS4 is a protein that in humans is encoded by the RABIF gene.

Function 

The Sec4/Rab-related small GTP-binding proteins are involved in the regulation of intracellular vesicular transport. Mss4 stimulates GTP-GDP exchange in Sec4 and Rab and binds to a subset of genetically related Rab proteins.

References

Further reading